Ruby Chow (June 6, 1920 – June 4, 2008) was a Chinese American restaurateur and politician in Seattle, Washington.

Early life
On June 6, 1920 Chow was born on a fishing dock in Seattle, Washington. Her given name was Mar Seung-gum. Chow's parents, Mr. and Mrs. Mar, were Chinese immigrants. Chow was a teenager during the depths of the Great Depression, which caused her to drop out of high school and start waiting tables for two dollars a day.

Career
She and her second husband opened Ruby Chow's restaurant in 1948 at 1122 Jefferson Street (at the corner of Broadway & Jefferson) in Seattle's First Hill neighborhood. It was the first Chinese restaurant outside of Seattle's Chinatown. She rented the attic of the restaurant to Bruce Lee. Chow leveraged her resources as a restaurant owner and community organizer to help get Wing Luke elected to the Seattle City Council in 1962 by having all the Chinese restaurants print "It's wise to vote for Wing Luke" as their fortune cookie fortunes.

Her political career started in 1973 when she decided to run for King County Council as a Democrat. She had an encounter with Ted Bundy (later known to be a serial killer) who, as a GOP campaign worker, tried to convince Chow, unsuccessfully, to go Republican. Chow stayed with the Democratic Party and served three terms as a King County councilwoman in Washington. She was the first Asian American elected to King County Council.

The county council named Ruby Chow Park, at the corner of S. Albro Place and 13th Avenue S. near Boeing Field, after Chow in 1985.

Personal life
Chow's first marriage produced two sons. Chow's second husband was Edward Shui "Ping" Chow (November 5, 1916 - June 29, 2011), who received U.S. Citizenship after he was discharged from United States Army. Chow had five children. Chow's children are Edward Chow Jr, Shelton Chow, Cheryl Chow, Brien Chow, and Mark Chow.

Chow's daughter, Cheryl Chow, served as a member of the Seattle City Council from 1990 to 1997.
Chow's son, Mark Chow, is a judge in King County District Court in Washington. He is the first Asian-American in the State of Washington to win election as a judge.

Chow's niece, Angie Mar, is the chef/owner of The Beatrice Inn in Manhattan's West Village.

Death
Chow died in 2008, two days before her 88th birthday, from heart failure in Seattle, Washington. Chow was survived by her five children and her husband, Edward Shui "Ping" Chow.

References

External links

1920 births
2008 deaths
20th-century American businesspeople
20th-century American businesswomen
20th-century American politicians
20th-century American women politicians
21st-century American women
American politicians of Chinese descent
American women restaurateurs
American restaurateurs
American women of Chinese descent in politics
Asian-American people in Washington (state) politics
Businesspeople from Seattle
King County Councillors
Politicians from Seattle
Washington (state) Democrats
Women in Washington (state) politics